Magnolia Award for Best Actress is awarded under the Shanghai Television Festival.

Winners and nominees

2020s

2010s

2000s

References

Shanghai Television Festival
Television awards for Best Actress